Flockaveli is the debut studio album by American rapper Waka Flocka Flame. The title of the album is a portmanteau of Waka Flocka Flame's name and that of the Italian political theorist Machiavelli, and was inspired by fellow American rapper Tupac Shakur, whose final stage name and pseudonym before his death was Makaveli. The album was recorded at Next Level Studios in Houston, NightBird Recording Studios in West Hollywood, and S-Line Ent. in Atlanta.

Released by Asylum Records on October 5, 2010, Flockaveli received generally positive reviews from critics, who complimented its musical intensity, brazen lyrics, and gangsta rap ethos. The album debuted at number 6 on the Billboard 200, with first-week sales of 37,000 copies in the United States. As of August 15, 2011, the album sold 400,000 copies in the United States.

Music and lyrics 
Flockaveli is a crunk album. It was primarily produced by Lex Luger, whose bombastic, grimly-programmed production incorporates drill 'n' bass 808 trills, bass kicks, hand claps, confrontational beats, dense synthesizers, and shifting sub-bass layers. Waka Flocka Flame's unrefined street raps feature constant ad libs. According to Pitchfork Media's David Drake, the songs reduce gangsta rap to its archetypical themes: "hypermasculine children of the drug trade, reckless fatalism, intensity, and physicality ... Waka's aggression is the survivalist reaction of the powerless, directed toward the threats of the immediate environment."

Promotion 
The album's lead single, called "O Let's Do It" was released on April 14, 2009. The song features guest appearances from Cap, who was credited for his verse only on the single, but was credited to be featured on the album. The song peaked at number 62 on the US Billboard Hot 100. The remix to "O Let's Do It" was released, featuring Diddy, Rick Ross and Gucci Mane.

The second single "Hard in da Paint" was released on May 13, 2010. In July, a music video for the song was released. The remix to "Hard in da Paint" featuring American R&B singer Ciara and rapper Gucci Mane was released.

The album's third single "No Hands" featuring Roscoe Dash and Wale, was released on August 17, 2010. It has peaked at number 13 on the Billboard Hot 100, making it his highest charting single in the United States. The album's fourth and final single "Grove St. Party" featuring Kebo Gotti, was released on February 15, 2011. It has charted at number 74 on the Billboard Hot 100 in the United States.

There are also music videos for the songs, such as "Snake in the Grass" featuring Cartier Kitten, "Bustin' at Em", "For My Dawgs", and "Live By the Gun" featuring Ra Diggs and Uncle Murda. On October 18, 2010, Waka Flocka Flame performed "Smoke, Drank" live on high-definition TV at the Roxy Theatre in West Hollywood.

Release and reception 

Flockaveli was released by Asylum Records on October 5, 2010. It debuted at number 6 on the US Billboard 200, with first-week sales of 37,000 copies in the United States. As of August 15, 2011, the album has sold 285,000 copies, according to Nielsen SoundScan.

Flockaveli received generally positive reviews from critics. At Metacritic, which assigns a normalized rating out of 100 to reviews from mainstream publications, the album received an average score of 75, based on 9 reviews. Jaimie Hodgson from NME commented that the album's songs "showcase a masterclass in reductionism; juggernauts of hulking, bruising, brick-to-skull intensity". BBC Music's Louis Pattison praised Waka Flocka Flame's "cold charisma", writing that "it’s channelled successfully here, a presence that permeates Flockaveli utterly". Ben Detrick of Spin complimented its "unforgiving crush of unveiled threats over ricocheting drums and choleric synths", and called Waka "more agitator than rapper—imagine DJ Kool as an unhinged goon with a fetish for brawling and gunfire". Sean Fennessey of The Village Voice called producer Lex Luger "a force whose tinnitus-inducing tracks demand replay" and wrote in conclusion, "Ultimately, the inflammatory Waka is an avatar for a new rap economy: few words delivered with force, with an eye to the stage and the check that arrives with it". Pitchfork critic David Drake described it as "a furious torrent of gangsta rap id" and praised Waka for giving the album its "frenetic intensity".

Rolling Stone writer Jody Rosen was less impressed and found Waka Flocka Flame's skills "negligible". Patrick Taylor of RapReviews called Waka "a blunt instrument that beats you into submission", and stated, "On an intellectual level, I don't like Flockaveli. The lyrics are simplistic and goonish. The music is effective but all sounds the same. If I was looking for an example of what hip-hop should be, it's not Waka Flocka Flame. On a gut level, though, Flockaveli works. It's morally questionable, but it hits hard". David Amidon from PopMatters described it as "a producer classic littered with verses so whack they become endearing in their special way", adding that Luger "pulls that special kind of synergy unique to hip-hop out of [Waka] again and again". Amidon wrote of its cultural significance, "This is a very specific album intended for a specific audience: downtrodden, powerless, forever seeking payment, pussy and freedom from the powers that be but in the process of accepting they may never find that experience. This is strictly hood music [...] it’s been a very long time since a hip-hop release felt like it truly didn’t give a fuck about anything but its local community while pushing its genre forward as much as possible".

In 2012, Complex named the album one of the classic albums of the last decade. In 2014, Billboard called the single "No Hands" the ninth most successful song in the 25-year history of their Hot Rap Songs chart.

Track listing

Personnel 
Credits for Flockaveli adapted from AllMusic.

 Debra Antney – A&R, executive producer
 Russell Dreyer – inside photo
 Drumma Boy – producer
 Cedric "Yayo" Herbert – producer
 Darryl "Big Dee" Johnson – A&R
 Liza Joseph – A&R
 L Don – producer
 Colin Leonard – mastering
 Lexus "Lex Luger" Lewis – producer
 Lil Jon – producer
 Joshua "Southside" Luellen – producer
 Juaquin Malphurs AKA Waka Flocka Flame – executive producer, A&R
 Amir Motamedi AKA Prince – producer
 Nathaniel Caserta AKA Purps – producer
 Mike Rev – cover design
 TaVon Sampson – art direction, design
 Sharod Simpson – cover photo
 Nigel Talley – A&R
 Carolyn Tracey – package production
 Finis "KY" White – engineer, mixing

Charts

Weekly charts

Year-end charts

References

External links 
 
 

2010 debut albums
Asylum Records albums
Albums produced by Drumma Boy
Albums produced by Lex Luger
Albums produced by Lil Jon
Waka Flocka Flame albums
Warner Records albums
Albums produced by Southside (record producer)